The eighth season of The Voice Brasil, premieres on Rede Globo on July 30, 2019 in the 10:30 / 9:30 p.m. (BRT / AMT) slot immediately following the primetime telenovela A Dona do Pedaço.

Ivete Sangalo, Lulu Santos and Michel Teló are joined by pop singer Iza, who replaced Carlinhos Brown, thus making it the first season to have two female coaches. With Brown's departure, Lulu serves as the last remaining coach from the show's inaugural season.

Tony Gordon was announced the winner of the season on October 3, 2019, making him the third stolen artist to win in the show's history as well as the oldest winner in the entire The Voice franchise to date (at the age of 53). Gordon's victory also marks a fifth straight win for Michel Teló, who became the first coach in the world to win five consecutive times.

Teams
 Key

Blind auditions
In this season, the number of blocks available per coach was raised, from one block to two blocks. 

Key

Episode 1 (July 30)

Episode 2 (Aug. 1)

Episode 3 (Aug. 6)

Episode 4 (Aug. 8)

Episode 5 (Aug. 13)

Episode 6 (Aug. 15)

The Battles
The 'block' twist, added in the Battles from last season, is returning in the Battle rounds. With this twist, each coach can use once to prevent one of the other coaches from getting a contestant in the "steals". Each coach has three steals.

Key

The Showdowns
Key

Live shows

Elimination chart
Artist's info

Result details

Week 1

Live Playoffs 1

Week 2

Live Playoffs 2

Quarterfinals

Week 3

Semifinals

Finals

Ratings and reception

Brazilian ratings
All numbers are in points and provided by Kantar Ibope Media.

References

External links
Official website on Gshow.com

8
2019 Brazilian television seasons